The Alagoas-black-throated trogon (Trogon muriciensis) is a critically endangered bird species of the family Trogonidae. It is endemic of Atlantic Forest, encountered only in  Estação Ecológica de Murici, in Alagoas state of Brazil.

References 

Endemic fauna of Brazil
Birds of Brazil
Trogon (genus)